Kerzerho lies approximately 8 km northwest of Carnac in the Erdeven commune and in the region of Brittany, France.

Buildings and structures in Morbihan
Megalithic monuments in Brittany
Archaeological sites in Brittany
Tourist attractions in Morbihan
Monuments historiques of Morbihan